Harold Pierce Cazneaux (30 March 1878 – 19 June 1953) was an Australian pictorialist photographer; a pioneer whose style had an indelible impact on the development of Australian photographic history. In 1916, he was a founding member of the Pictorialist Sydney Camera Circle. As a regular participator in national and international exhibitions, Cazneaux was unfaltering in his desire to contribute to the discussion about the photography of his times. He created some of the most memorable images of the early twentieth century.

Biography
 Harold Pierce Cazneaux  was born in Wellington, New Zealand on 30 March 1878. His father Pierce Mott Cazneaux was an English-born photographer and his mother Emily Florence was a colourist, miniature painter and photographer from Sydney. In the 1890s the family moved to Adelaide and Harold started working in his father's studio and attended H. P. Gill's evening classes at the School of Design, Painting and Technical Arts.

In 1904 he decided to move to Sydney where he took up a position with one of Sydney's oldest photo studios, Freeman & Co. Clearly he was good at the job as he was later appointed the firm's manager and chief operator. At the same time he honed his photographic skills documenting the architecture of old Sydney and in 1907 exhibited the Photographic Society of New South Wales. In 1909 he held the first one-man exhibition in Australia.

Cazneaux's prints were exhibited in solo shows in the windows of the Kodak Salon, Sydney, as well as international shows organised by the London Salon of Photography (1911 to 1952), and later included in the Royal Photographic Society of Great Britain's annual salons. In 1914 he won Kodak's "Happy Moment" competition, and the £100 prize money went to a deposit for his future home.

He was a founder of the Sydney Camera Circle whose Pictorialist "manifesto" was drawn up and signed on 28 November 1916 by a group of six photographers: Cecil Bostock, James Stening, W. S. White, Malcolm McKinnon and James Paton, later joined by Henri Mallard. This group pledged "to work and to advance pictorial photography and to show our own Australia in terms of sunlight rather than those of greyness and dismal shadows".

In 1921 he was elected a member of the London Salon and in 1937 he was the first Australian to be conferred an Honorary Fellowship by the Royal Photographic Society. Beyond his photographic oeuvre, Cazneaux was also a prolific writer.  As a correspondent for Photograms of the Year (UK) for more than twenty years, he was the international voice of Australian photography. He was official photographer for Sydney Ure Smith's lifestyle magazine The Home from 1920 to 1941, and was commissioned to produce images for a number of Ure Smith's publications, including Sydney Surfing (1929), The Bridge Book (1930), The Sydney Book (1931) and The Australian Native Bear Book (1932).

The use of light was a defining characteristic of Cazneaux's later work and in 1916 he and others formed the Sydney Camera Circle, establishing the so-called 'Sunshine School' of photography. The Circle was created for a number of important reasons: it embraced the particularities of Australian light and landscape, and was a move away from the English-inspired darker imagery dominating photographic practice at that time.

Cazneaux's work was championed for decades by the editor of The Home magazine, Sydney Ure Smith.

The National Library of Australia is the home of the principal archive of Cazneaux prints and negatives, thanks to the generosity of the Cazneaux family. The Art Gallery of New South Wales also has a fine collection of Cazneaux's work, and was the first Australian museum to hold a major exhibition of his work in 1975.

The exhibition Harold Cazneaux: artist in photography at the Art Gallery of New South Wales in June and July 2008 included more than 100 of his iconic images, exploring the breadth and depth of his work such as landscape, portraits, the harbour and the city.

An exhibition of his photographs, called "Thoroughly modern Sydney: 1920s and 30s glamour and style" was held at the Museum of Sydney, in Sydney in August–October 2006.  It was assembled largely from images he took for the Australian magazine "Home", though it also included new prints from previously unpublished negatives. The subject ranged across "all that was fashionable and new" at that time, covering architecture, art and interior design, and also including many portraits of Australians then active in those fields.

He married Winifred, and had five daughters, including Joan and Rainbow, and a son, Harold, who died aged 21 at Tobruk in 1941.  The entrepreneur and adventurer Dick Smith is his grandson.

Cazneaux lived for much of his life in the Sydney suburb of Roseville. His home, a Federation cottage called Ambleside, is located in Dudley Avenue, but was sadly neglected as of 2012.

The Cazneaux Tree

One of Cazneaux's most famous images was taken in 1937, of a solitary river red gum tree, near Wilpena Pound in the Flinders Ranges of South Australia. The title he gave to the photograph was "The Spirit of Endurance", for the qualities he felt epitomised the tree's survival in a harsh environment.

The tree still stands and, known as "The Cazneaux Tree", is a notable landmark within the Flinders Ranges National Park, classified as number 239 on the National Trust of South Australia's Register of Significant Trees.

See also
 French Australian

Notes

References
Helen Ennis "Intersections: Photography, History and the National Library of Australia", Canberra : National Library of Australia, 2004. 
Melissa Miles "The Language of Light and Dark: Light and Place in Australian Photography", Sydney : Power Publications, 2015. 
Gael Newton. "Australian pictorial photography : a survey of art photography from 1898 to 1938 organised by the Art Gallery of New South Wales, Sydney" Sydney : Trustees of the Art Gallery of New South Wales, 1979. 
Gael Newton ; with essays by Helen Ennis and Chris Long and assistance from Isobel Crombie and Kate Davidson. "Shades of light : photography and Australia 1839-1988" Canberra : Australian National Gallery : Collins Australia, 1988.  (Collins Australia : pbk.)
Gael Newton "Silver and Grey: fifty years of Australian photography 1900 - 1950", Sydney: Angus and Robertson, 1980.

Sources
 Robert McFarlane, Leading light, Good Weekend magazine, 21 May 2008

External links
Harold Cazneaux : photographs chiefly of domestic architecture and gardens. 16 photoprints titled & signed by Cazneaux on reverse; 2 hand col. photoprints signed at lower right of image; 6 photoprints titled on reverse by Cazneaux, State Library of New South Wales.
Lesley G. Lynch (1979). Cazneaux, Harold Pierce (1878–1953) (Australian Dictionary of Biography ed.). National Centre of Biography, Australian National University
  [CC-By-SA]
  Shades of Light  (Australian Photography 1839 - 1988) the online version of the original Shades of Light published 1998, Gael Newton, National Gallery of Australia.
 Australian Pictorialism, Gael Newton, "Australian pictorial photography : a survey of art photography from 1898 to 1938 organised by the Art Gallery of New South Wales, Sydney" Sydney : Trustees of the Art Gallery of New South Wales, 1979.

Australian photographers
1878 births
1953 deaths
New Zealand people of Australian descent
People from Wellington City
New Zealand emigrants to Australia